The 1976–77 All-Ireland Senior Club Hurling Championship was the seventh staging of the All-Ireland Senior Club Hurling Championship, the Gaelic Athletic Association's premier inter-county club hurling tournament. The championship began on 24 October 1976 and ended on 27 March 1977.

James Stephens of Kilkenny were the defending champions, however, they were defeated by Camross in the Leinster final. Cúchulainn's of Armagh, Kilmessan of Meath, Kiltormer of Galway and St. Gabriel's of London were first-time participants.

On 27 March 1977, Glen Rovers won the championship following a 2-12 to 0-08 defeat of Camross in a replay of the All-Ireland final. This was their second All-Ireland title overall and their first in four championship seasons.

Frank Keenan of Camross was the championship's top scorer with 4-31.

Results

Connacht Senior Club Hurling Championship

Quarter-finals

Semi-final

Final

Leinster Senior Club Hurling Championship

First round

Quarter-finals

Semi-finals

Final

Munster Senior Club Hurling Championship

Quarter-finals

Semi-finals

Final

Ulster Senior Club Hurling Championship

Semi-finals

Final

All-Ireland Senior Club Hurling Championship

Quarter-final

Semi-finals

Final

Championship statistics

Top scorers

Overall

Single game

References

1976 in hurling
1977 in hurling
All-Ireland Senior Club Hurling Championship